Dato' Dr. Sahruddin bin Jamal (born 26 May 1975) is a Malaysian politician who  has served as Chairman of the Malaysian Pineapple Industry Board (MPIB) since May 2020 and Member of the Johor State Legislative Assembly (MLA) for Bukit Kepong since May 2018. He served as the 17th Menteri Besar of Johor from April 2019 to the collapse of the Pakatan Harapan (PH) state administration in February 2020 and Member of the Johor State Executive Council (EXCO) also in the PH state administration under former Menteri Besar Osman Sapian from May 2018 to his promotion to Menteri Besarship in April 2019. He is a member of the Malaysian United Indigenous Party (BERSATU), a component party of the ruling Perikatan Nasional (PN) coalition.

Background
Sahruddin was born on 26 May 1975 to a peasant family at Kampung Baru Batu 28, Lenga, Muar, Johor. He formerly studied at Sekolah Menengah Kebangsaan (SMK) Sultan Alauddin Riayat Shah 1, Pagoh. He holds a Bachelor of Medicine, Bachelor of Surgery (MBBS) degree from Universitas Hasanuddin, Makassar, South Sulawesi, Indonesia. He previously had worked as a Medical Doctor at the Sultanah Fatimah Specialist Hospital (HPSF), Muar for five years and later operated his own three clinics, Klinik Dr Sahruddin, at Bukit Pasir, Bandar Universiti Pagoh and Pagoh in Muar before entering politics.

Sahruddin married Datin Dr. Nila Armila Mukdan who is also a doctor and they have three daughters.

Politics
In the 2018 general election he made his debut contested as PPBM candidate under the PH coalition and managed to win the Bukit Kepong state seat to be its Johor assemblyman. Subsequently, Sahruddin was appointed as Johor's EXCO and holds the portfolio for Johor state Health, Environment and Agriculture Committee chairman.

He was appointed and sworn in as the 17th Johor Menteri Besar on 14 April 2019 to replace predecessor Osman Sapian who resigned after 11 months in that position. He was replaced by Hasni Mohammad of United Malays National Organisation (UMNO) on 28 February 2020 after the collapse of PH state government during the 2020 Malaysian political crisis.

Election results

Honours
Sultan Ibrahim of Johor conferred on Sahruddin the award Darjah Sultan Ibrahim Johor Yang Amat Disanjungi Pangkat Kedua Dato' Mulia Sultan Ibrahim Johor (DMIJ) on 22 April 2019 upon his appointment as Menteri Besar.

Honours of Malaysia
  :
  Knight of the Order of Sultan Ibrahim of Johor (DMIJ) – Dato' (2019)

See also
 Bukit Kepong (state constituency)

External links

References

1975 births
Living people
People from Johor
People from Muar
Malaysian people of Malay descent
Malaysian people of Javanese descent
Malaysian Muslims
Malaysian general practitioners
Malaysian United Indigenous Party politicians
Members of the Johor State Legislative Assembly
Johor state executive councillors
Chief Ministers of Johor
Hasanuddin University alumni
21st-century Malaysian politicians